The men's 200 metres at the 1988 Summer Olympics in Seoul, South Korea had an entry list of 72 competitors from 59 nations, with ten qualifying heats (72), five quarterfinal races (40) and two semifinals (16), before the final (8) took off on Wednesday September 28, 1988. The maximum number of athletes per nation had been set at 3 since the 1930 Olympic Congress. The event was won by Joe DeLoach of the United States, beating his teammate and defending champion Carl Lewis by 0.04 seconds in the final. The defeat ended Lewis's hopes of repeating his 1984 quadruple, despite running the final under his own Olympic record time. It was the United States' 14th victory in the men's 200 metres. Lewis was the seventh man to win multiple medals in the event, matching Andy Stanfield for the best result to that point (a gold and a silver). Robson da Silva earned Brazil's first medal in the event with his bronze.

Background

This was the 20th appearance of the event, which was not held at the first Olympics in 1896 but has been on the program ever since. Three of the eight finalists from the 1984 Games returned: gold medalist Carl Lewis of the United States, fifth-place finisher Ralf Lübke of West Germany, and seventh-place finisher Pietro Mennea of Italy. Mennea was competing in his fifth Games in this event, having won bronze in 1972, finished fourth in 1976, and won gold in 1980 previously. Lewis was attempting to repeat his 1984 quadruple of winning the 100 metres, 200 metres, long jump, and 4x100 metres relay (and had started well on that goal, winning the 100 and the long jump). He had placed second in the U.S. trials to Joe DeLoach in this event, however, and the competition between the two was expected to be tight. Nobody else running the event was thought to be close to the American pair.

Burkina Faso, Chinese Taipei, the Maldives, Saint Vincent and the Grenadines, South Yemen, Tonga, Vanuatu, and Vietnam each made their debut in the event. The United States made its 19th appearance, most of any nation, having missed only the boycotted 1980 Games.

Competition format

The competition used the four round format introduced in 1920: heats, quarterfinals, semifinals, and a final. The "fastest loser" system introduced in 1960 was used in the heats and quarterfinals.

There were 10 heats of 7 or 8 runners each, with the top 3 men in each advancing to the quarterfinals along with the next 10 fastest overall. The quarterfinals consisted of 5 heats of 8 athletes each; the 3 fastest men in each heat and the next fastest overall advanced to the semifinals. There were 2 semifinals, each with 8 runners. The top 4 athletes in each semifinal advanced. The final had 8 runners. The races were run on a 400 metre track.

Records

These were the standing world and Olympic records (in seconds) prior to the 1988 Summer Olympics.

Joe DeLoach and Carl Lewis both finished the final under the Olympic record time; DeLoach's 19.75 seconds became the new record, while Lewis's 19.79 seconds was good for silver.

Schedule

All times are Korea Standard Time adjusted for daylight savings (UTC+10)

Results

Heats

First 3 from each heat (Q) and the next 10 fastest (q) qualified for the quarterfinals.

Quarterfinals

Quarterfinal 1

Quarterfinal 2

Quarterfinal 3

Quarterfinal 4

Quarterfinal 5

Semifinals

Semifinal 1

Semifinal 2

Final

Carl Lewis' time of 19.79 seconds was the fastest non-winning time until the 1996 Olympic final.

DeLoach's winning margin of 0.04 seconds remains the smallest winning margin in the history of the event.

See also
 1984 Men's Olympic 200 metres (Los Angeles)
 1986 Men's European Championships 200 metres (Stuttgart)
 1987 Men's World Championships 200 metres (Rome)
 1990 Men's European Championships 200 metres (Split)
 1991 Men's World Championships 200 metres (Tokyo)
 1992 Men's Olympic 200 metres (Barcelona)

References

External links
  Official Report

2
200 metres at the Olympics
Men's events at the 1988 Summer Olympics